The 1981 U.S. Open was the 81st U.S. Open, held June 18–21 at the East Course of Merion Golf Club in Ardmore, Pennsylvania, a suburb northwest of Philadelphia. David Graham won his second major title and became the first Australian to win the U.S. Open, three strokes ahead of runners-up George Burns and Bill Rogers.

After a first round 66, Jim Thorpe made history as the first African-American since 1896 to lead the U.S. Open. Burns took a one-stroke lead over Graham with a 66 in the second round, then increased his lead to three strokes after 54 holes.

In the final round on Sunday, Graham shot one of the most precise rounds in U.S. Open history. He hit nearly every green in regulation, missed just one fairway, and recorded four birdies, missing several other opportunities from within . The only bogey was a three-putt at the fifth, after his approach shot stopped above the hole. After a string of eight pars, Graham finally passed Burns with birdies at the 14th and 15th holes. Graham carded a 67 to Burns' 73 to win by three strokes. Rogers shot 69 to tie Burns for 2nd and won the British Open four weeks later.

This was the fourth U.S. Open played at Merion, all at its East Course. Previous editions were hosted in 1934, 1950, and 1971. At , the same length as 1971, it was the shortest U.S. Open course since 1947. With heavy rains softening the course before the tournament, 93 rounds of par 70 or better were recorded. Fifteen players were under par after 36 holes, but only five finished under par for the four rounds. Five more were at even par 280, including defending champion Jack Nicklaus, a four-time winner.

After 1981, the U.S. Open was not played at Merion until 2013.

Course layout

East Course 

Source:

Lengths of the course for previous U.S. Opens:
1971: , par 70
1950: , par 70
1934: , par 70

Past champions in the field

Made the cut

Missed the cut

Round summaries

First round
Thursday, June 18, 1981

Second round
Friday, June 19, 1981

Amateurs: Rassett (E), Norton (+8), Pavin (+9), DeFrancesco (+10), White (+10), Sindelar (+11), Faxon (+12), Lawrence (+14), Sanchez (+14), Moore (+15), Mudd (+15), Yokoi (+15), Biancalana (+16), Jones (+16), Ludwig (+16), Magee (+17), Hurter (+21), Brodie (+22).

Third round
Saturday, June 20, 1981

Final round
Sunday, June 21, 1981

Amateur: Rassett (+14).

Scorecard
Final round

Cumulative playoff scores, relative to par
{|class="wikitable" span = 50 style="font-size:85%;
|-
|style="background: Pink;" width=10|
|Birdie
|style="background: PaleGreen;" width=10|
|Bogey
|}
Source:

References

External links
USGA Championship Database
USOpen.com - 1981
Trenham Golf History  – 1981 U.S. Open

U.S. Open (golf)
Golf in Pennsylvania
U.S. Open
U.S. Open (golf)
U.S. Open (golf)